The International Consumer Protection and Enforcement Network (ICPEN), formerly the International Marketing Supervision Network (IMSN), is a global network of consumer protection authorities which engages in dispute resolution and encourages cooperation between law enforcement agencies for disputes arising from commerce across international borders.  Many members are also members of the Organisation for Economic Co-operation and Development (OECD).

History
Delegates from Australia, Austria, Belgium, Canada, Denmark, France, Finland, Germany, the Netherlands, Hungary, Ireland, Japan, New Zealand, Norway, Portugal, Spain, Sweden, Switzerland, the United Kingdom, and the United States established the Network in 1992, with participation from representatives of the OECD and the EU. Greece, Italy, and Luxembourg joined the network later that year.

The ICPEN partners includes organizations from Angola, Suriname, Peru (2013), Kenya and Kosovo (2014).

Participating nations
The following nations are represented in the network:

External links
https://econsumer.gov/
Who We Are: ICPEN

References

International trade associations
International trade organizations
International law organizations
Organizations established in 1992
Consumer protection